 
The European Publishers Award for Photography was run for 22 years by a number of European publishers, who simultaneously published a photobook of each year's winning portfolio in their own languages.

The award was for work on a particular subject that had not previously been published as a book. In its later years it was open to photographers anywhere: European nationality or residence was not required.

The award began in 1994 with six publishers. At the time of its apparent end in 2015, two publishers, Dewi Lewis (Britain) and Peliti Associati (Italy) had participated every year since the start. In Germany, Edition Braus published the award-winner from 1994 until 2010 (in 1998 and 1999, as Umschau Braus); Kehrer Verlag took over in 2011. In France, Marval published the winner from 1994 to 1996,  in 1997 and 1998, and Actes Sud thereafter. In Spain, Lunwerg Editores published the winner from 1994 to 2010; and, after a break of one year, Editorial Blume resumed in 2012. Five publishers, in five nations, were involved in 2015.

There had also been participation from Dutch and Greek publishers. In the Netherlands, Stichting Fragment Foto published the first two winners, and Focus Publishing (Uitgeverij Focus) the third; Mets & Schilt published the winner from 2006 to 2008. In Greece, Apeiron Photos published the winner from 2003 to 2010.

The award was for some years associated with Leica: the published winner from both 1996 and 1999 acknowledge the support of Leica; and in 2006, the award was renamed the Leica European Publishers Award for Photography. This lasted until 2008; "Leica" was dropped from the name for 2009.

The award also had support from other corporations.

As 2016 ended, no award for the year had been announced and Kehrer was describing the annual award in the past tense but allowing for the possibility of a resumption: "The Award is currently under review. / A further announcement will be made in Fall 2016."

Award winners

Notes

References

External links
European Publishers Award for Photography, archived on 4 March 2016

Photo
Photography awards
Awards established in 1994
Awards disestablished in 2016
1994 establishments in Europe
2016 disestablishments in Europe
Leica Camera